Richard Hetherington O'Kane (February 2, 1911 – February 16, 1994) was a United States Navy submarine commander in World War II, who was awarded the Medal of Honor for commanding  in the Pacific War against Japan to the most successful record of any United States submarine ever. He also received three Navy Crosses and three Silver Stars, for a total of seven awards of the United States military's three highest decorations for valor in combat. Before commanding Tang, O'Kane served in the highly successful  as executive officer and approach officer under noted Commander Dudley "Mush" Morton. In his ten combat patrols, five in Wahoo and five commanding Tang, O'Kane participated in more successful attacks on Japanese shipping than any other submarine officer during the war.

Early life and education
O'Kane was born in Dover, New Hampshire, on February 2, 1911. He was the youngest of four children of University of New Hampshire entomology professor Walter Collins O'Kane, of Irish ancestry, and his wife, Clifford Hetherington. O'Kane graduated from Phillips Academy, Andover in 1930 and the United States Naval Academy in May 1934, upon which he was commissioned an officer in the United States Navy.

Naval career
O'Kane spent his first years of active duty on the heavy cruiser  and destroyer . O'Kane qualified for submarines aboard Argonaut in 1938 and remained aboard until her overhaul at Mare Island in 1942.

World War II
In early 1942, Lieutenant O'Kane joined the pre-commissioning crew of the new submarine  and served as its executive officer on five war patrols during World War II, first under Lieutenant Commander Marvin G. "Pinky" Kennedy and later under the legendary Lieutenant Commander Dudley "Mush" Morton. Morton established a record as an excellent tactician, as he preferred to run the demanding analysis and plots while his executive officer manned the periscopes, a reversal of standard practices. Under Morton's tutelage, O'Kane developed the skills which enabled him to become the single most accomplished American submarine commander in history.

He placed her in commission in October 1943 and commanded her for her entire career. He was an innovator, and developed several operational tactics that markedly increased his ship's effectiveness. Among these were daylight surface cruising with extra lookouts, periscope recognition and range drills (enabling clear tactical sureness when seconds counted), drifting when not bound somewhere, and methods of night surface attacks, one of his favorite techniques to obtain and maintain the initiative in battle.

In five war patrols on the Tang, O'Kane was originally recognized with sinking a total of 24 Japanese ships – the second highest total for a single American submarine and the highest for a single commanding officer. Postwar reviews of Japanese war records, corroborated by Tangs surviving logs and crewmen, revised the totals to 33 ships totalling over  sunk. This placed Tang first for both number of ships and tonnage (ahead of s 26 ships and s 100,231 long tons). Several times during the war, he took Tang into the middle of a convoy and attacked ships ahead and behind – counting on Tangs relative position, speed, and low profile to keep clear of enemy escorts.

Tangs third patrol, into the Yellow Sea, sank more Japanese ships than any other submarine patrol of the war. O'Kane claimed eight ships sunk; post-war analysis increased this to 10 ships. During one attack, he fired six torpedoes at two large ships. Japanese records showed the torpedoes actually hit four ships. This number of sinkings surpassed the next highest patrol, Wahoos (with O'Kane as executive officer) in the same area the year before.

Under O'Kane, Tang also performed "lifeguard duty", a common joint operation, with a Fast Carrier Task Force, of positioning one or more submarines in a "ditching station" off an enemy island under air attack in order to rescue downed pilots. Off Truk, he and the Tang rescued 22 airmen in one mission, thus earning a Presidential Unit Citation.

O'Kane was captured by the Japanese when Tang was sunk in the Formosa Strait by her own flawed torpedo (a circular run of a Mark 18) during a surface night attack on October 24–25, 1944. O'Kane lost all but eight members of his crew, and was at first secretly held captive at the Ōfuna navy detention center, then later moved to the regular army Omori POW camp. Following his release, O'Kane received the Medal of Honor for "conspicuous gallantry and intrepidity" during his submarine's final operations against Japanese shipping.

Post-war appointments
In the years following World War II, O'Kane served with the Pacific Reserve Fleet as commanding officer of the submarine tender , testified at Japanese war crimes trials, was executive officer of the submarine tender  and was Commander, Submarine Division 32 (ComSubDiv 32). He was a student at the Armed Forces Staff College in 1950–51 and was subsequently assigned to the Submarine School at New London, Connecticut, initially as an instructor and, in 1952–53, as the commanding officer.

Promoted to the rank of captain in July 1953, O'Kane commanded the submarine tender  until June 1954 and then became Commander, Submarine Squadron Seven (ComSubRon 7). Following studies at the Naval War College in 1955–56, he served in Washington, D.C., with the Ship Characteristics Board. O'Kane retired from active duty in July 1957 and, on the basis of his extensive combat record and under the tombstone promotion rule in effect at the time, was simultaneously advanced to the rank of rear admiral on the Retired List.

Later life and legacy
O'Kane died of pneumonia in Petaluma, California, at age 83. O'Kane and his wife Ernestine (1912–2008) are buried at Arlington National Cemetery, in Arlington, Virginia.

The O'Kane Cribbage board
The wardroom of the oldest fast attack submarine in the United States Pacific fleet (currently , as of 29 October 2019) carries O'Kane's personal cribbage board, and upon decommissioning the board is transferred to the next oldest boat. Prior to Chicago, the cribbage game set was aboard:
 , as of 21 May 2021. Before that;
 , as of 4 February 2011. Before that;
 , as of 19 October 2004. Before that;
 , as of 2 April 2002. Before that;
 , as of 1994 after the passing of Admiral O'Kane.

The second Tang was in commission with the US Navy until 1980 when she was transferred to Turkey.

Summary of war patrols

Awards and decorations
In addition to the Medal of Honor, O'Kane received three Navy Crosses, three Silver Stars, the Legion of Merit with "V" device for valor, the Purple Heart and several other decorations throughout his career.  (O'Kane's original ribbon rack is on display at the US Navy Submarine Force Museum in Groton, Connecticut.)

Medal of Honor citation
Rank and organization: Commander, United States Navy, commanding USS Tang. Place and date: Vicinity Philippine Islands, October 23, and October 24, 1944. Entered service at: New Hampshire. Born: February 2, 1911, Dover, N.H.

Works
He wrote books about his service on Tang and Wahoo, entitled Clear the Bridge!: The War Patrols of the USS Tang and Wahoo: The Patrols of America's Most Famous World War II Submarine, respectively.

See also

 List of Medal of Honor recipients

Notes

References

Further reading

External links
 

1911 births
1994 deaths
United States Navy personnel of World War II
Burials at Arlington National Cemetery
American people of Irish descent
Recipients of the Navy Cross (United States)
United States Navy Medal of Honor recipients
Recipients of the Legion of Merit
Recipients of the Silver Star
United States Naval Academy alumni
United States Navy rear admirals (lower half)
United States submarine commanders
Naval War College alumni
People from Dover, New Hampshire
World War II prisoners of war held by Japan
American prisoners of war in World War II
World War II recipients of the Medal of Honor